The Dutch Eredivisie in the 1988–89 season was contested by 18 teams. PSV won the championship.

League standings

Results

See also
 1988–89 Eerste Divisie
 1988–89 KNVB Cup

References

 Eredivisie official website - info on all seasons 
 RSSSF

Eredivisie seasons
Netherlands
1988–89 in Dutch football